Duncan Buyskes (17 September 1912 – 31 October 1994) was a South African cricketer. He played in one first-class match for Eastern Province in 1933/34.

See also
 List of Eastern Province representative cricketers

References

External links
 

1912 births
1994 deaths
South African cricketers
Eastern Province cricketers
People from Hantam Local Municipality